Ducos may refer to:

People with the surname
 Jean-Ernest Ducos de La Hitte, French nobleman
 Jean-François Ducos (1765–1793), French politician
 Juan García Ducós, Puerto Rican politician and senator
 Louis Arthur Ducos du Hauron (1837–1920), French pioneer of color photography
 Maurice Ducos (born 1904), French swimmer
 Roger Ducos, French political figure 
 Théodore Ducos (1801–1855), French politician and shipowner
 Zoe Ducós (1928–2002), Argentinian actress

Places
 Canton of Ducos, Martinique
 Ducos, Martinique
 , New Caledonia

Other
 Pierre Ducos, character in Sharpe